There are two FundAmerica companies.  The current and active FundAmerica is an SEC-compliant company offering tools for tech-driven securities offerings. It was acquired by Prime Trust and continues to be a product offering of Prime Trust.

The second is FundAmerica, Inc.. It was a discount buying club that marketed consumer buying club memberships through multi-level marketing. The business began in 1987 in Los Angeles, California before moving its offices to Irvine, California. 

FundAmerica's founder, Robert T. Edwards, was arrested in July 1990 for allegedly running a pyramid scheme.  
FundAmerica filed for bankruptcy in August 1990 In late August 1990, Robert T. Edwards was fined $20.4 million dollars by Florida for running a pyramid scheme.  In 1994 in Florida, the company pleaded no contest to a reduced charge of misrepresenting investors' odds of success and paid a $200,000 fine.  A new company, FundAmerica 2000, was started with Robert Edwards as a consultant.

References 

 Record Number 9007260151
 Record Number 9008060184

External links
  The current SEC-compliant company offering tools for tech-driven securities offerings.
  The parent company that acquired FundAmerica.
 False Profits "We're Looking For Five Exceptional Leaders..." - False Profits, Mentions FundAmerica
 LA times articles on the company

Defunct companies based in California
Marketing companies established in 1987
Pyramid and Ponzi schemes
Defunct multi-level marketing companies